Joshua Kendall Lalor (born 2 November 1987) is an Australian cricketer who plays for New South Wales and Melbourne Renegades.

Lalor, who has Aboriginal Australian ancestry, was born in Mount Druitt, New South Wales. He is a marketing graduate of the University of Western Sydney.

Playing career
Lalor made his debut for New South Wales in a List A match on 20 November 2011, making his first-class debut five days later. In the T20 Big Bash League, Lalor has represented five different teams including the Perth Scorchers, the Sydney Sixers, the Sydney Thunder, and the Brisbane Heat. During the 2018–19 Big Bash League season, while playing for the Heat, Lalor took a hat trick against the Perth Scorchers on 1 February 2019.

References

1987 births
Living people
New South Wales cricketers
Perth Scorchers cricketers
Sydney Sixers cricketers
Sydney Thunder cricketers
Brisbane Heat cricketers
Indigenous Australian cricketers
Melbourne Renegades cricketers
Cricket Australia XI cricketers